Keith Harris is an American record producer, songwriter and multi-instrumentalist.

Harris has worked with several popular recording and live acts in the music industry. Hits "Meet Me Halfway" and "Imma Be" by Black Eyed Peas, "It's My Birthday" by Will.i.am, "American Boy" by Estelle, "Feel Good" by Robin Thicke,  "Can't Stop Won't Stop" by Usher, and "Gang Bang" by Madonna, and "Be Okay" and "Let's Rock" by Chrisette Michele are among the songs Harris has contributed to.

Early life
Harris was born and raised in Chicago's South Side. He began his music career playing with the city's New Friendship Missionary Baptist Church gospel choir.

Recalling to Modern Drummer Magazine how he started: "Harris survived being thrown to the lions thanks in part to how he got his start behind the kit – playing drums in his church’s band.  “I come from a Gospel background,” he explains. “Having to learn songs fast is part of the everyday life of a church musician doing Gospel music.  A lot of times we would do concerts where there was no sheet music and we had thirteen songs in different styles. So just being able to absorb music quickly and keep it locked in is how I’ve learned to approach music.”

"At Chicago’s Curie performing arts high school, Harris picked up more important tools of the trade, building his sight-reading chops, honing the keyboard and bass skills he’d picked up in church, mastering concert percussion, and performing blazing drum solos with the advanced jazz band and stage bands.  After high school, Harris attended Berklee College of Music in Boston, graduating with a degree in production and engineering.  Armed with the skills and know-how to succeed on both sides of the music-making process, he relocated to New York to work as an engineer for Bad Boy Records hit maker Richard Younglord Frierson."

Career
"Producer, songwriter and musician Keith Harris is the driving force behind many top 10 singles and Grammy Award winning hits. "Meet Me Halfway" and "Imma Be" by The Black Eyed Peas and Grammy winners "American Boy" by Estelle and "Be Okay" by Chrisette Michele are just a few. A Chicago native, Harris is best known for his drumming chops that round out the sounds of multi-platinum selling recording artists The Black Eyed Peas and Fergie. In addition, Harris' album credits read like a who's who of the music industry including Michael Jackson, Mary J. Blige, Mariah Carey, Christina Aguilera, Chris Brown, Pussycat Dolls, Earth Wind and Fire, John Legend and many more."

DRUM! Magazine says of Harris: "the hottest drummer in hip-hop.. pocket provider."

"Harris produced three tracks on the Peas' smash CD The E.N.D., including the Top Ten hit "Meet Me Halfway," which went Number One on the UK Singles Chart, and "Ring-A-Ling.""Imma Be" is the third single from the Peas record-breaking The E.N.D. to hit Number One.  He worked on Fergie's 2006 solo smash The Dutchess.

In 2007 Harris released the album entitled "The Band Behind The Front" with Bucky Jonson on the BBE label.

Filmography 

 Be Cool (2005)
Cast: Black Eyed Peas

 La La Land (2016)
Cast: Cole

Discography 

Fergie – Double Dutchess 
 "Life Goes On" (producer)

Nicki Minaj – The Pinkprint 
 "Grand Piano" (writer & producer)

will.i.am – It's My Birthday 
 "It's My Birthday" (writer)

 Goapele – Strong As Glass 
 "Strong As Glass", "Hey Boy", "My Love", "Powerful", "Truth Is" (producer)

 Leah McFall – Name of the album TBA 
 "Home" (producer)

Robin Thicke – Blurred Lines 
 "Feel good" (co-writer)

Britney Spears – Britney Jean 
 "Perfume" (producer)

will.i.am – #Willpower 
 "Love Bullets" (writer)

Usher – Looking 4 Myself 
 "Can't Stop Won't Stop" (producer)

Madonna – MDNA 
 "Gang Bang" (writer)

 The Black Eyed Peas – The E.N.D. (Energy Never Dies) 
2010 Grammy Winner for Best Pop Album
 "Imma Be" x2 Plat (producer)
 "Meet Me Halfway" x2 Plat (producer)
 "Ring A Ling" (producer)
 "Outta My Head" (writer)
 "Where Ya Wanna Go" (writer)

 Chrisette Michele – I Am 
2009 Grammy Award for Best Urban/Alternative Performance
 "Be Okay" (producer)
 "Let's Rock" (writer)

 Murs – Murs for President 
 "Lookin Fly" (writer)

 Mariah Carey – E=MC2 
 "Heat" (writer)

 Estelle – Shine 
2009 Grammy Award for Best Rap/Sung Collaboration Nominee for Song of The Year
 "American Boy" (writer)

 Jully Black – Revival 
2008 Juno Winner for Best R&B Album
 Executive producer/ producer

 Michael Jackson – Thriller 25 
 "The Girl Is Mine" (producer)
 "P.Y.T." (producer)

 Chris Brown – Exclusive 
 "Picture Perfect" (writer, keyboards)

 Nicole Scherzinger – Her Name is Nicole 
 "Baby Love" (writer, Rhodes)

 will.i.am – Songs About Girls 
 "Will vs Superblack" (writer, synths)
 "Impatient" (writer, Rhodes)
 "Fly Girl" (writer, drums, Rhodes)

 Busta Rhymes – The Big Bang 
 "I Love My Chick" (producer)

 Fergie – The Dutchess 
 "All That I Got" (producer)
 "Close To You" (producer)

 Kelis – Kelis Was Here 
 "Till The Wheels Fall Off" (producer)
 "Weekend" (writer)

 Mary J. Blige – The Breakthrough 
 "About You" (writer)

 The Black Eyed Peas – Monkey Business 
 "Dum Diddy" (producer)
 "Bend Your Back" (writer)

 Ginuwine – Back II da Basics 
 "In Da Club" (producer)

 Sleepy Brown – Mr. Brown 
 "One of Dem Nights" (Writer, drums, bass)

 Fergie – Poseidon Soundtrack 
 "Won't Let You Fall" (writer)

 Bucky Jonson – The Band Behind The Front 
 Co-producer and writer

 God Made Me Funky – Enter the Beat 
 Producer

Musician credits 

 will.i.am 
 2009 Inauguration Neighborhood Ball – Drums

 AIRPUSHERS 
 "Hold The Onions" – Drums

 The Black Eyed Peas 
 Drums, keys

 Christina Aguilera 
 Drums

 John Legend 
 Keyboards

 Macy Gray 
 Drums, organ, bass

 Earth, Wind and Fire 
 Drums

 Mary J. Blige 
 Keyboards

 Ginuwine 
 Keyboards

 Sérgio Mendes 
 Ride and Fills

 Ricky Martin 
 Drums

 Busta Rhymes 
 Keyboards

Musical director 

 Fergie
 Meghan Trainor
 Fifth Harmony
 Will.i.am – #Willpower
 Cheryl Cole – A Million Lights Tour 2012
 CeeLo Green - Loberace Show 2013
 Backstreet Boys – In a World Like This Tour 2013

Touring 

 2003 – present, drummer for The Black Eyed Peas and Fergie

Press

Print 
 May 2010, In Tune Magazine, "The Write Stuff" feature
 April 2010, Drumbead Magazine, "A Day in the Life”
 February 2010, Music Connection Magazine clip of Keith Harris on stage marriage proposal
 July 2009, Drum! Magazine, "Keith Harris, Soul in The Machine”
 Vibe Magazine article on the Bucky Jonson forthcoming CD
 September 2007, Drum! Magazine, Keith Harris article in the "Trial By Fire"
 Modern Drummer Magazine, "Pocket Comes First”
 2005 Festival International de Jazz de Montreal
 2005 Rolling Stone, "Up in It”
 2005 Apple Pro/Music "Turning Ideas into Songs”
 2005 M-‐Audio "On The Road with the Black Eyed Peas Band”

References 

Year of birth missing (living people)
Living people
Songwriters from Illinois
Record producers from Illinois
Musicians from Chicago
Black Eyed Peas
Fergie
Grammy Award winners